Herne Hill railway station is in the London Borough of Lambeth, South London, England, on the boundary between London fare zones 2 and 3. Train services are provided by Thameslink to London Blackfriars, Farringdon, St Pancras International and St Albans on the Thameslink route and by Southeastern to London Victoria (via Brixton) and Orpington on the Chatham Main Line. It is  down the line from Victoria.

The station building on Railton Road was opened in 1862 by the London, Chatham and Dover Railway. Initial service was only to Victoria, but by 1869 services ran to the City of London, King's Cross, Kingston via Wimbledon, and Kent, including express trains to Dover Harbour for continental Europe. The arrival of the railways transformed Herne Hill from a wealthy suburb with large residential estates into a densely populated urban area.

Description 
Herne Hill railway station sits at the bottom of the hill that gives the area its name and is close to Brockwell Park. The section of Railton Road outside the station is mixed usage for pedestrians and vehicles.

The Chatham Main Line and Sutton Loop railway lines through Herne Hill are elevated above road level on a brick viaduct that runs north–south. The station's 1862 Gothic, polychrome brick building is on the western side of the viaduct, with access to the station also from the east via a foot tunnel from Milkwood Road. The building houses a ticket office and newsagent, and was Grade II listed in 1998: the listing notes the station's arched doorways, Welsh slate roof and decorative brickwork. It was described by Cherry and Pevsner as a "handsome group" and featured on the cover of a book about London's railway architecture. The station entrance canopy (which had been shortened and altered in the mid-20th century) was removed in 2015, owing to its state of disrepair; a new one was installed in July 2016, with a new timber valance design and cornice based on the original Victorian one.

The four tracks are served by two island platforms; northbound trains call at the western platform and southbound trains the eastern platform, providing cross-platform interchange between the two routes.

There are flat junctions at each end of the station: Herne Hill North Junction, where the lines to Loughborough Junction and Brixton diverge; and Herne Hill South Junction, where the lines to West Dulwich and Tulse Hill diverge. Thameslink and Southeastern services cross each other's paths at the junctions, constraining capacity on both routes. The station also has a turnback siding on its eastern side, adjacent to Milkwood Road.

History 
The area now known as Herne Hill had been a rural part of the Manor of Milkwell since the 13th century. Two tributaries of the River Effra met at the undeveloped site of the future station; it was known as Island Green until the 18th century.

In 1783 a timber merchant, Samuel Sanders, bought Herne Hill from the Manor. Sanders granted leases for large plots of land to wealthy families – John Ruskin spent his childhood at an estate on Herne Hill. The Effra was covered over in the 1820s; and the area had become an upper-class suburb by the mid-19th century (a contemporary author referred to the hill as "the Elysium" for merchants). The opening of the railway station, which provided convenient and cheap access to central London, started the urbanisation of Herne Hill. All of the large estates were eventually cleared to make way for many smaller houses. An 1870 railway travel guide noted the population of Herne Hill was 701; the contemporaneous development of new residential streets would increase the population by 3,000.

Construction 

A railway line through Herne Hill was proposed in 1852 by the Mid Kent and London and South Western Junction Railways Company. No construction work was undertaken at that time and the company had ceased to exist by 1860.

In the late 1850s, the East Kent Railway had ambitions to run passenger trains between Kent and London, but it did not own any railway lines in inner London. It reached an agreement with the London, Brighton and South Coast Railway (LB&SCR) in 1858 to use its West End and Crystal Palace line to access Battersea and (from 1860) Victoria. This arrangement incurred costly access fees, but it was necessary until the company obtained Parliamentary authority to build in London.

On 6 August 1860, the Metropolitan Extensions Act granted the London, Chatham and Dover Railway (LCDR; the successor to the East Kent company) the powers to build three inner London lines: Beckenham Junction to Herne Hill; Herne Hill to Farringdon; and Herne Hill to Battersea to connect with the lines into Victoria. The route from Beckenham Junction to Battersea closely resembled that of the 1852 proposal, going via Clapham, Brixton, Herne Hill, Dulwich and Sydenham.

The station was designed by architect John Taylor and railway engineers Joseph Cubitt and J.T. Turner. The building was intended to impress: it had tea rooms offering buffets, decorative brickwork and a tower (which also served the practical function of concealing the water tank for steam locomotives). The Building News described the station in 1863 as "spacious and convenient ... and of the very best quality". It also stated that "an unusual amount of decorative taste has been displayed" in the station's construction; even the viaduct was praised as "one of the most ornamental pieces of work we have ever seen attempted on a railway" for its fine brickwork. The station's design prompted the journal to write a 2,000-word editorial bemoaning the comparatively poor architectural quality of other contemporary civil engineering projects. An architectural critic later noted the station was "eulogised" by journals upon its opening and that its architecture was still seen as exemplary at the end of the 19th century.

There were initially two platforms, up and down. The up platform was accessed from the upper floor of the station building via a stairway outside the building. The station's original signal box, elevated above the railway viaduct at the junction between Norwood Road and Half Moon Lane, was a prominent feature in Herne Hill for many years.

The land for the station was compulsorily purchased from the estate of Thomas Vyse (died 1861), manufacturer of straw hats and owner of the Abbey, an estate at 70 Herne Hill; the station and much of the viaduct were built on part of the Abbey's grounds. A new road (Station Road) was built from the junction of Norwood Road and Half Moon Lane, Herne Hill's main thoroughfare, to the station.

The line from Beckenham Junction reached Herne Hill from the south in July 1863, connecting the station to the LCDR's lines in Kent, and finally allowing the LCDR to avoid using the LB&SCR's tracks to access Victoria from Kent.

In 1868, the LB&SCR opened a suburban line from London Bridge to Sutton via . A  connecting line from Tulse Hill to Herne Hill opened on 1 January 1869.

Early services 
From July 1863, LCDR trains between Victoria and Kent ran through Herne Hill, and to continental Europe via a connecting steamboat from Dover Harbour to Calais; these boat trains left Victoria and Ludgate Hill simultaneously and were joined at Herne Hill. Services to London were split at Herne Hill to give passengers easier access to the City of London and beyond; the LCDR began operating direct services to King's Cross and Barnet (now High Barnet Underground station) from Herne Hill when Snow Hill tunnel opened.

A popular workmen's train (one penny per journey) ran between Ludgate Hill and Victoria via Herne Hill from 1865. Trains left from both termini at 04:55 and returned at 18:15. The LCDR was compelled to operate this service by Parliament to compensate for the large number of working-class homes destroyed in Camberwell during the construction of the City Branch. Regular one-way fares to Ludgate Hill were eightpence, sixpence and fourpence for first, second and third class respectively (or return for one shilling, ninepence and sevenpence respectively), with journey times of 15 minutes on express trains and 26 minutes when calling at all stops.

Both the Great Northern Railway (GNR) and the London and South Western Railway (LSWR) helped fund the Metropolitan Extensions (£320,000 and £310,000 respectively; £ and £ in ) in return for the right to use the LCDR's tracks. The GNR ran trains between Hatfield and Herne Hill from August 1866 until March 1868 (when the trains were diverted to Victoria via Loughborough Junction); this was a busy all-stops service, with 15 trains leaving Hatfield and 14 leaving Herne Hill every day. The LSWR began running trains between Ludgate Hill and Wimbledon via Herne Hill when the Tulse Hill extension was completed. Some of these services went as far as Kingston until the mid-1890s.

Changes from 1870 to 1923 
By 1870, a track had been added to the east of the station and two sidings had been added to the west; one of the western sidings was a bay platform for passenger trains, which was accessed from the platform adjoining the upper floor. Interlocking signalling was in use at Herne Hill by 1880.

The LCDR enlarged the station in 1884 to meet growing demand: the viaduct was widened to allow for the construction of a second island platform and two lines to the east (the easternmost line was used only for freight); and the foot tunnel under the viaduct was opened. In 1885, the LCDR decided to use Blackfriars Bridge railway station solely as a goods yard but lacked the space to sort wagons at the site. It purchased  of land between Herne Hill and Loughborough Junction for this purpose. A stationmaster's house was built at 239 Railton Road in the mid-1880s as the site offered a good view of the station (it is now privately owned). In 1888, Railton Road was extended to the Norwood Road/Half Moon Lane junction and Station Road ceased to exist.

At the beginning of 1899, the LCDR and the neighbouring South Eastern Railway (SER) combined their operations as the South Eastern and Chatham Railway (SECR), jointly owned by the two railways. The SECR ran the trains, but the lines and stations continued to be owned by the LCDR or SER.

A late-night service from Ludgate Hill (departing 01:15) to Beckenham Junction via Herne Hill began in 1910. The intention was to satisfy journalists on Fleet Street who regularly complained in print about the poor quality of service on the line; those working on the morning papers often worked beyond midnight and missed the last train.

Services to Farringdon from Herne Hill were discontinued in 1916 with the closure of Snow Hill tunnel to passengers, and trains from the south terminated at Holborn Viaduct. The LCDR amalgamated with the LB&SCR, SER and several other railways to form the Southern Railway at the start of 1923.

Modernisation 
Work began on electrifying the former LCDR suburban routes in 1924. Herne Hill station was extensively remodelled as part of these works: the eastern island platform was lengthened; the original island platform was demolished and replaced by one further west, allowing two tracks to be laid between the island platforms; the western sidings were removed; and the upper floor was closed to passengers.

On 12 July 1925, a 660-volt third-rail system came into operation on both routes through Herne Hill, from Victoria to Orpington on the Chatham Main Line and along the entire length of the City Branch. Electric trains ran every 20 minutes on both routes during the day and were kept overnight at the sorting sidings north of the station.

The distinctive signal box overlooking Norwood Road and a similar signal box at the northern end of the station were demolished in 1956 and replaced by a single signal box adjacent to the north junction. The replacement signal box was in use from June 1956 until December 1981, when its functions were transferred to Victoria; the building still exists and is used by railway staff. The signalling at Herne Hill was upgraded from semaphores to colour lights on 8 March 1959 as part of the Kent Coast electrification plan.

By 1959, the pattern of commuter services at Herne Hill had taken the shape it held into the 21st century: all-stops trains from Victoria to Orpington and from the City of London to Wimbledon and Sutton (but, unlike the modern Sutton Loop, via West Croydon). However, there was a decline in the number of electric trains on the Chatham Main Line through Herne Hill in the years after the war. Immediately after electrification in 1925, six trains used the route between Herne Hill and Shortlands in each direction during every off-peak hour. By 1960, it had dropped to two trains in each direction.

The Herne Hill Sorting Sidings closed on 1 August 1966 and the freight line to the east of the station was taken out of service. Nothing of the sidings remains: residential accommodation has been built along Shakespeare Road (on the western sidings) and commercial premises have been built along Milkwood Road (on the eastern sidings).

From 1988  
In 1988, Snow Hill tunnel re-opened and the former LCDR City Branch formed the basis of the new Thameslink route. Network Rail began a major upgrade of the route in 2009. A key objective of the Thameslink Programme was allowing more trains to travel between central London and Brighton, which was prevented by a bottleneck between London Bridge and Blackfriars on a viaduct through the historic Borough Market. Network Rail initially suggested widening the viaduct and demolishing part of the market, but the public backlash against this plan prompted Network Rail to consider permanently routing all Thameslink trains to/from Brighton via Herne Hill, avoiding London Bridge and the market. This would have required the grade separation of the two lines through Herne Hill, which would have been achieved by constructing a new viaduct immediately to the east of the existing viaduct and using a fly-over to connect the southern end of the new viaduct to the line between Tulse Hill and North Dulwich (taking the tracks over the Chatham Main Line and towards Tulse Hill). This proposal was rejected in 2004 because of its environmental impact on Herne Hill and the larger number of interchanges offered on the London Bridge route; the Borough Market viaduct was widened instead.

From 1994 until the completion of High Speed 1 in November 2007 Eurostar services linking London Waterloo to Brussels and Paris passed through Herne Hill without stopping. This marked the end of rail services to the continent via Herne Hill, which had been started by the LCDR in 1863 when the line between Victoria and Dover via Herne Hill was completed.

The upper floor of the station, which had not been used by passengers since 1925, was converted into  of office space in 1991 and rented as 'Tower House' (after the station's distinctive tower). The disused freight line to the east of the station was partly reopened in 2009 as a siding for use by Thameslink trains to compensate for the loss of sidings when the Moorgate Thameslink branch was closed. The line's connection to the south junction was severed during these works. The station had become fully accessible by 2010: lifts were installed to provide step-free access to the platforms in 2008 and a unisex disabled-accessible toilet was opened on the southbound platforms in 2010.

Accidents and disruption 

On 6 November 1947, a steam train approaching from West Dulwich passed a signal at danger in heavy fog and crashed into an electric train crossing the station's south junction towards Tulse Hill. One passenger on the electric train was killed and nine others were hospitalised.

A minor accident occurred on 30 June 1957. A light engine travelling towards Tulse Hill was waiting to cross the south junction when it was struck from behind by an express passenger train from Victoria that had passed a signal at danger. The driver of the light engine and two passengers from the express were hospitalised but quickly discharged.

A steam locomotive was waiting on the southbound track outside Herne Hill for a proceed signal when the signalman cleared an electric passenger train behind the steam locomotive to proceed down the same track. The steam locomotive was struck from behind, killing the electric train's driver.

Future

Services 
The route through the station was busier from December 2014 to 2018 as Thameslink trains serving London Bridge were diverted via Herne Hill – an additional four trains per hour in both directions. This was due to the redevelopment of London Bridge that temporarily closed it to Bedford-Brighton trains. The additional trains did not call at Herne Hill; they ran fast between London Blackfriars and East Croydon. It was not possible for the 12-car peak trains to call at Herne Hill as the platforms are too short and it was not viable to use selective door operation as the carriages not on the platforms would foul the junctions.

Network Rail, in its July 2011 London & South East route utilisation strategy, recommended that all services from Herne Hill towards Blackfriars should terminate in the bay platforms at Blackfriars after London Bridge's redevelopment is completed in 2018 and the diverted Thameslink trains return there. Passengers from Herne Hill would then have had to change at Blackfriars to travel further north. Network Rail made this recommendation because more services will be using the route between St Pancras and London Bridge from 2018; sending trains from Herne Hill to the terminating platforms on the western side of Blackfriars (instead of the through tracks on the eastern side of the station) would have removed the need for them to cross in front of trains to/from Denmark Hill and trains to/from London Bridge at junctions south of Blackfriars.

In January 2013, the Department for Transport (DfT) announced that trains serving the Sutton Loop Line (also known as the Wimbledon Loop) will continue to travel across London after 2018. The number of trains calling at Herne Hill on the route will remain unchanged, with four trains per hour. The DfT also decided the Sutton/Wimbledon Loop will remain part of the Thameslink franchise until at least late 2020; following which the route is now served by the Class 700 trains.

In the longer term, Network Rail has forecast that by 2031 there will be 900 more passengers attempting to travel on the route between Herne Hill and Blackfriars during the busiest peak hour every weekday than can be accommodated on the trains. It is anticipated that eight-car trains with higher capacity (similar to the Class 378 trains used on inner London metro routes) will eventually be required to address this shortfall.

Station infrastructure 

The route from Victoria to Orpington via Herne Hill is projected to be amongst the most congested and overcrowded in South East London by 2026. Network Rail is considering grade-separating the two lines passing through Herne Hill so that trains would not cross each other's paths at the station's junctions; this restricts the number of services that can pass through the station. A 2008 route utilisation strategy for South London concluded that this improvement will not be required before 2020 but recommended safeguarding the required land. Grade-separation is supported by Southeastern and First Capital Connect believed it should be given more consideration, but Network Rail has stated that it would be difficult to carry out the work because the station is on a viaduct and surrounded by buildings. The 2011 route utilisation strategy, which examined options for congestion relief at Herne Hill before 2031, did not suggest grade-separation as an option in the 2011–2031 period.

This project would also enable the platforms at Herne Hill to be lengthened to accommodate 12-car trains as the current northern junction, which prevents them from being extended, would be removed. However, longer trains could not be used on the Sutton/Wimbledon Loop without also rebuilding Tulse Hill and Elephant & Castle.

The congestion within the station itself has been noted by Network Rail and it is keeping the situation under review. Transport for London (TfL) has recommended that specific improvement works (new entrance doors, removal of interior wall, wider stairs to platforms and second station entrance) be carried out between 2014 and 2019.

TfL has also suggested there may be potential for the turnback siding adjacent to Milkwood Road to be converted for passenger use. This would require substantial changes to the station as there is no direct access to the platforms from Milkwood Road and the current subway for accessing the platforms does not extend east of the southbound platform.

Incorporation into London Overground 
The Mayor of London published a long-term vision for the London Overground in February 2012. It recommends that all London suburban rail services should eventually be devolved to TfL and that suburban services currently provided by Southeastern be devolved before 2020 to demonstrate the benefits of this approach. Southeastern's suburban services include the route between Victoria and Orpington via Herne Hill. TfL had announced that it would bid in late 2012 to have more involvement in these services after the expiration of Southeastern's franchise in early 2014, but the DfT announced in March 2013 that Southeastern's franchise was being extended until mid-2018.

Victoria line extension 
TfL has considered extending the Victoria line to Herne Hill to provide faster turnaround at the southern end of the line. The extension is not a priority for TfL as it has a weaker business case than other infrastructure projects.

Service pattern 

Services at Herne Hill are operated by Southeastern and Thameslink using ,  and  EMUs.

The typical off-peak service in trains per hour is:
 4 tph to  via London Blackfriars
 2 tph to 
 2 tph to  via 

During the peak hours, additional Southeastern services operate between London Victoria and Bromley South.

Connections
London Buses routes 3, 37, 68, 196, 201, 322, 468, school route 690 and night routes N3 and N68 serve the station.

Notes

References

External links 

Former London, Chatham and Dover Railway stations
Railway stations in the London Borough of Lambeth
Railway stations in Great Britain opened in 1862
Railway stations served by Govia Thameslink Railway
Railway stations served by Southeastern
Railway station
1862 establishments in England